Cágado River may refer to rivers in Brazil:

 Cágado River (Minas Gerais)
 Cágado River (Sergipe)
 Cágado river, a river in the Brazilian state of Minas Gerais